The Battle of Yichang was fought in western Hubei on April 11, 1929 between the armies of Sichuan and Guangxi as part of the internal conflicts within the Kuomintang leading up to the Central Plains War. Both Liu Xiang and the new Guangxi clique were nominally independent from Chiang Kai-shek's authority despite their nominal affiliation with the Kuomintang.

Bibliography
中華民國國防大學編，《中國現代軍事史主要戰役表》

Yichang 1929
Yichang 1929
1929 in China